Abdul Rahman Al Shammari (born 13 February 1993) is a Kuwaiti footballer who plays for Al-Nasr SC as a striker.

References 

1993 births
Living people
Kuwaiti footballers
Association football defenders
Kuwait international footballers
2015 AFC Asian Cup players
Sportspeople from Kuwait City
Kuwait Premier League players
Al-Nasr SC (Kuwait) players